Life Overtakes Me (English: The Apathetic Children) is a 2019 Swedish-American documentary film directed by Kristine Samuelson and John Haptas. The film shows how hundreds of refugee children in Sweden withdraw into a coma-like illness called resignation syndrome because of the uncertainties of their legal status.

The film was released on Netflix on June 14, 2019.

The film was nominated for an Oscar for best short-subject documentary, for the 92nd Academy Awards in 2020.

Controversy
According to witnesses cited by the Swedish magazine Filter, one of the children profiled in the film was pressured by her parents to simulate resignation syndrome for the express purpose of improving the family's prospects for permanent residence status in Sweden. The witnesses insisted that the girl had been a well-functioning, normal child who was coached into faking her illness when doctors and officials were present.

Sweden's public television network, SVT, interviewed Swedish pediatrician Karl Sallin, who said that the filmmakers had cherry-picked phrases from interviews with him in a "reckless and dangerous" fashion, distorting his view of the situation. SVT sought the producers repeatedly for comment, who chose not to respond.

References

External links
 
 
 

2019 short documentary films
2019 films
Netflix original documentary films
Swedish-language films
Refugees in Sweden
Documentary films about child refugees
Documentary films about children
Documentary films about health care
2010s English-language films